The Zu Lai Temple (in Chinese, 如來寺, in Portuguese, "Templo Zu Lai", lit. Tathāgata Temple) is a Buddhist temple in Cotia, São Paulo, Brazil. It is the largest Buddhist temple in South America with 10,000 square meters of constructed area, inside an area of approximately 150,000 square meters.
It is a branch temple of the Fo Guang Shan order in Taiwan, practicing the Mahāyāna branch of Buddhism. The Zu Lai Temple states as its main objective the cultural and religious dissemination of the Buddhist Tradition, whilst trying to reach to the general population the teachings of traditional buddhist education, culture and meditation.

History
In 1992, the religious Buddhist Master Hsing Yun had arrived in Brazil, by an invitation of a local Buddhist Temple in Sao Paulo, for a ceremony. An accompanying monk, Jue Cheng, decided to stay in the country and begin a new project with the objective of disseminating the Buddhist tradition in the predominantly Catholic country. It started as a relatively small temple and had grown to great proportions as time went by and local interest for Buddhism had grown.

See also

 IBPS Manila
 Nan Hua Temple
 Chung Tian Temple
 Hsi Lai Temple
 Buddhism in South Africa
 Fo Guang Shan Buddha Museum
 Fo Guang Shan Temple, Auckland

References

Buddhist temples in Brazil
Fo Guang Shan temples